The smc Pentax-F 17–28mm Fish-eye 3.5–4.5 is the first fisheye zoom lens, manufactured by Pentax for single-lens reflex cameras (SLRs) with a K lens mount. At its widest setting of 17mm, it affords a 180° diagonal angle of view images for all K-mount full-frame SLR cameras; at 28mm, the diagonal angle of view is reduced to 90° on the diagonal. Typical fisheye barrel distortion is evident at all focal lengths. A successor model, the Pentax DA 10-17mm lens, was introduced with the same view angles and closer focusing capability for APS-C cameras in 2006.

History and design
The lens was designed by Jun Hirakawa and a patent was applied for the design in 1994, granted in 1998.

Longtime photography writer Herbert Keppler was a noted fan of the lens, as its unique zoom capabilities allow the user to minimize the appearance of barrel distortion. Keppler wrote in an informal review "You don't use this lens to make your best girl- or boyfriend look pretty or handsome, but it does produce some fantastically fascinating effects. [...] there still are many moments when its coverage just fits the coverage of my mind."

Gallery

References

External links

The 17-28mm smc PENTAX-F "on the fisheye list"/

Specifications

17
Fisheye lenses
Camera lenses introduced in 1995